Metachanda gerberella is a moth species in the oecophorine tribe Metachandini. It was described by Henry Legrand in 1965.

References

Oecophorinae
Moths described in 1965